The Scary Guy (sometimes stylized THE SCARY GUY) (born ) is a United Kingdom-based American motivational speaker who campaigns worldwide to eliminate hate, violence, prejudice, and bullying in schools and corporations. In addition to being a tattoo shop owner, comic, entertainer, inspirational speaker, and performance artist, The Scary Guy has pierced nose, eyebrows, and ears and covers over 85 percent of his body with tattoos.

Early life
The Scary Guy was born on December 29, 1953, as Earl Kenneth Kaufmann, to his father, Carroll August Kaufmann, and his mother Constance Joan Buckingham. Growing up in New Hope, Minnesota, The Scary Guy graduated in 1972 from Cooper Senior High School and excelled as a voice major at Macalester College, in Saint Paul.

Tattoos
The Scary Guy got his first tattoo at the age of 30 and now has tattoos that cover an estimated 85% of his body. Over the years, his collection has grown as a reflection of his life experiences. They are what he calls, 'modern tribalism', reflecting on various emotional events.  One of these is a tattoo of a man called "Yuppiecide", a representation of his former self. Scary Guy's other tattoos represent his love of art and others are chosen simply because The Scary Guy was a computer salesman at one point in his life and they looked "cool".

Bibliography 
 Hatwood, Mark David. 7 Days and 7 Nights – An Official Biography of The Scary Guy. VisionHeart, Inc. 2008

Videos
 
 
 
 
 
 
 The Scary Guy on Firepit Friday

Films
 Scary also known as Scary – tattoo therapy, title in German : Scary – Furchterregend (2006) by Uli Kick, Arte, Bayerischer Rundfunk, Filmworks, Südwestrundfunk, Westdeutscher Rundfunk.

See also
Teachers' TV

References

External links
Official website

American social workers
American motivational speakers
American businesspeople
Personal development
1953 births
American tattoo artists
Living people
People from New Hope, Minnesota